The 1942–43 season was Real Madrid Club de Fútbol's 40th season in existence and the club's 11th consecutive season in the top flight of Spanish football.

Summary
The club had the third worst campaign ever, finishing 10th and avoiding relegation by just one single point. Head coach Juan Armet "Kinké" was fired on round 12 after a bad streak of results, then after one match with Pablo Hernandez Coronado managing another lost game, the executive board appointed Ramon Encinas with the main goal of avoiding relegation, which he successfully accomplished.

After having remained in the first category aimed by the goals of Manuel Alday, which included an emphatic 7–0 victory over Español, the squad advanced rounds in the 1943 Copa del Generalísimo, where it fared far better, reaching the semi-finals and meeting archrivals FC Barcelona there. In the first leg of the series the club lost 0–3 but then, on 13 June 1943, the squad defeated Barcelona with a colossal 11–1 scoreline, being in fact the most landslide result in El Clásico. In the final, the squad was defeated 1–0 by Atletico Bilbao with a Telmo Zarra extra time goal.

Squad

Transfers

Competitions

La Liga

Position by round

League table

Matches

Copa del Generalísimo

Semi-finals

Final

Statistics

Squad statistics

Players statistics
Source:

References

Real Madrid CF seasons
Real Madrid CF